Fabio Nicolas Dixon (born 21 June 1999) is a Swiss footballer who plays as a right-back for Swedish club Dalkurd.

International career
Born in Switzerland, Dixon is of Jamaican descent. He is a youth international for Switzerland.

References

External links

1999 births
Footballers from Zürich
Living people
Swiss men's footballers
Switzerland youth international footballers
Swiss people of Jamaican descent
Association football defenders
FC Zürich players
FC Chiasso players
AC Bellinzona players
Dalkurd FF players
Swiss Super League players
Swiss Challenge League players
Superettan players
Swiss expatriate footballers
Expatriate footballers in Sweden
Swiss expatriate sportspeople in Sweden